In mathematical analysis, the Chebyshev–Markov–Stieltjes inequalities are inequalities related to the problem of moments that were formulated in the 1880s by Pafnuty Chebyshev and proved independently by Andrey Markov and (somewhat later) by Thomas Jan Stieltjes. Informally, they provide sharp bounds on a measure from above and from below in terms of its first moments.

Formulation

Given m0,...,m2m-1 ∈ R, consider the collection C of measures μ on  R such that

 

for k = 0,1,...,2m − 1 (and in particular the integral is defined and finite).

Let P0,P1, ...,Pm be the first m + 1 orthogonal polynomials with respect to μ ∈ C, and let ξ1,...ξm be the zeros of Pm. It is not hard to see that the polynomials P0,P1, ...,Pm-1 and the numbers ξ1,...ξm are the same for every μ ∈ C, and therefore are determined uniquely by m0,...,m2m-1.

Denote

.

Theorem For j = 1,2,...,m, and any μ ∈ C,

References

Theorems in analysis
Inequalities